The 2011 Indy Grand Prix of Sonoma was the seventh running of the Indy Grand Prix of Sonoma and the fourteenth round of the 2011 IndyCar Series season. It took place on Sunday, August 28, 2011. The race contested over 75 laps at the  Infineon Raceway in Sonoma, California. Will Power led 71 of 75 laps, as Team Penske swept 1st–2nd–3rd on the podium. It was the first 1–2–3 finish in an Indycar race for Penske since Nazareth in 1994. Power closed to within 26 points of championship leader Dario Franchitti. Power also closed within 7 points of Franchitti for the Mario Andretti Road Course Trophy. Simon Pagenaud substituted for Simona de Silvestro after she had complications renewing her visa, and U.S. Customs would not allow her into the country.

Classification

Race 

 Penalty for blocking, moved to end of lead lap

Championship standings after the race
Drivers' Championship standings

 Note: Only the top five positions are included.

References

External links 
 IndyCar Results Page

Indy Grand Prix of Sonoma
Indy Grand Prix of Sonoma
Indy Grand Prix of Sonoma
Indy Grand Prix of Sonoma